Events in the year 2020 in the Principality of Andorra.

Incumbents
Co-Princes: Emmanuel Macron and Joan Enric Vives Sicília
Prime Minister: Xavier Espot Zamora

Events
Ongoing – COVID-19 pandemic in Andorra
24 July – 9 August – Andorra was scheduled to compete at the 2020 Summer Olympics in Tokyo, having qualified in women's K1 canoe slalom.

Deaths

5 January – Antoni Morell Mora, diplomat, civil servant, writer and lawyer (b. 1941).
16 February – Joan Armengol, attorney and politician (b. 1922/1923).
14 August – Francesc Badia Batalla, civil servant and magistrate, Episcopal Veguer (b. 1923).

References

 
2020s in Andorra
Years of the 21st century in Andorra
Andorra
Andorra